Anthony Andrews (born 11 March 1967) is a Jamaican cricketer. He played in six List A and three first-class matches for the Jamaican cricket team from 1992 to 1996.

See also
 List of Jamaican representative cricketers

References

External links
 

1967 births
Living people
Jamaican cricketers
Jamaica cricketers
People from Westmoreland Parish